The 1978 Nippon Professional Baseball season was the 29th season of operation for the league.

Regular season standings

Central League

Pacific League

Japan Series

Yakult Swallows won the series 4–3.

See also
1978 Major League Baseball season

References

1978 in baseball
1978 in Japanese sport